Mannem Madhusudana Rao, well known as MMR is an Industrialist and Managing Director of MMR Group of Companies.

References

Year of birth missing (living people)
Living people
Indian industrialists